The Federation of European Publishers (FEP) is an independent, non-commercial umbrella association of book publishers associations in the European Union and Europe.

FEP represents 29 national associations of book publishers of the European Union and of the European Economic Area. FEP is the voice of the great majority of publishers in Europe.

The FEP Secretariat is located in Brussels, Belgium.

The book is the first cultural industry in Europe (EU and EEA) with an annual sales revenue of book publishers of approximately € 22.4 billion according to a survey conducted by FEP for the year 2019.

A total of about 605,000 new titles were issued by publishers in 2019 and approximately 130,000 people are employed full time in book publishing.

These figures show the importance of publishing industry in terms of innovation, growth and employment in Europe. The book industry is a key player in the knowledge society and economy and contributes actively to achieve the Lisbon Agenda goals.

History 
Founded on 19 January 1967 (then called Groupement des éditeurs de livres de la Communauté - GELC), 

FEP deals with European legislation and advises publishers’ associations on copyright and other legislative issues.

Timeline:

1958

First consideration about monitoring European matters.

1967

GELC (Groupement des éditeurs de livres de la Communauté) founded by Belgian, French, Italian, Dutch and German Publishers Associations.

1973

British, Danish and Irish Publishers Associations join GELC as their countries become member of the European Community.

1981

Greek Publishers Association joins GELC as its country becomes member of the European Community.

1984

GELC secretariat is reorganised to give it a permanent representative with EC officials and directorate generals.

1986

Spanish and Portuguese Publishers Associations join GELC as their countries gain membership of the European Community.

1990

The Federation of European Publishers (FEP)/ la Fédération des Editeurs Européens (FEE) becomes the umbrella organisation representing European book publishers associations, Luxembourg Publishers Association joins FEP.

1992

Austrian and Finnish Publishers Associations join FEP. The Norwegian association also adheres, even though a referendum rejects Norwegian EC membership.

1996

FEP drafts new statutes designed to ensure that candidates associations from Central and Eastern Europe could become members.

1997

FEP 30th anniversary

2002

Hungarian, Cypriot, Czech and Slovenian Publishers Associations join FEP

2003

Lithuanian Publishers Association joins FEP

2004

Polish, Estonian and Icelandic Publishers Associations join FEP

2006

Bulgarian Publishers Association joins FEP

2007

FEP 40th anniversary

2011

Romanian Publishers Association joins FEP

2013

Serbian Publishers & Booksellers Association joins FEP

2014

Latvian Publishers Association joins FEP

2017

FEP 50th anniversary

Membership
The Federation of European Publishers has members from 29 national associations: 

Austria:  

Belgium (French): Association des Editeurs Belges

Belgium (Dutch): Vlaamse Uitgevers Vereniging (VUV)

Bulgaria: Bulgarian Book Association

Czech Republic: The Association of Czech Booksellers and Publishers

Denmark: 

Estonia: Estonian Publishers' Association

Finland: 

France: 

Germany: Börsenverein des Deutschen Buchhandels

Greece: Hellenic Federation Publishers and Booksellers

Hungary: Hungarian Publisher's and Bookseller's

Iceland: Icelandic Publishers Association

Ireland: Irish Book Publishers’ Association

Italy: 

Latvia: Latvian Publishers’ Association

Lithuania: Lithuanian Publishers association

Luxembourg: Fédération Luxembourgeoise des Editeurs

Netherlands: 

Norway: Norwegian Publishers Association

Poland: Polish Chamber of Books

Portugal:  

Romania: Federation of Publishers in Romania

Serbia: Association of Publishers and Booksellers of Serbia

Slovakia: Association of Publishers and Booksellers of the Slovak Republic

Slovenia: Chamber of Commerce and Industry of Slovenia

Spain:

Sweden: 

United Kingdom: The Publishers' Association

FEP Board 

Mr Peter Kraus vom Cleff, President

CFO of Rowohlt (Germany)

Mr Ricardo Franco Levi, Vice-President

President of the Italian Publishers Association (AIE - Associazione Italiana Editori)

Mr Benedikt Föger, Treasurer

Managing Director of the Austrian Publishing House Czernin Verlag

President of the Austrian Publishers Association (Hauptverband des Österreichischen Buchhandels).

Ms Catherine Blanche, Board Member

Counsellor International Policy at the French Publishers Association (SNE - Syndicat National de l’Edition)

Mr Sakari Laiho, Board Member

Director at The Finnish Publishers Association (Suomen Kustannusyhdistys)

Mr Michiel Kolman, Board Member

Publishers delegate at De Mediafederatie (The Netherlands)

List of FEP Presidents 

1990-1992: President Alain Gründ

1992-1994: President Pere Vicens

1994-1996: President Volker Schwarz

1996-1998: President John Clement

1998-2000: President Ulrico Carlo Hoepli

2000-2002: President Michael Gill

2002-2004: President Anton Hilscher

2004-2006: President Arne Bach

2006-2008: President Jonas Modig

2008-2010: President Federico Motta

2010-2012: President Fergal Tobin

2012-2014: President Piotr Marciszuk

2014-2016: President Pierre Dutilleul

2016-2018: President Henrique Mota

2018-2020: Rudy Vanschoonbeek

2020- ongoing: Peter Kraus vom Cleff

See also
International Publishers Association

References

External links
 

Publishing-related professional associations